The 1998 Arkansas State Indians football team represented Arkansas State University as an independent during the 1998 NCAA Division I-A football season. Led by second-year head coach Joe Hollis, the Indians compiled a record of 4–8.

Schedule

References

Arkansas State
Arkansas State Red Wolves football seasons
Arkansas State Indians football